The comprehensive discography of 311, a rock band, originally from Omaha, Nebraska, consists of thirteen studio albums, one live album, twenty-four live concerts released via Live311 four compilation albums, five extended plays, thirty-three singles, and seven video albums. 

Their first two studio albums, 1990's Dammit! and 1991's Unity, did not chart. Their next two studio albums, 1993's Music and 1994's Grassroots, both appeared on the Top Heatseekers chart.

The band's 1995 studio album 311 went three times platinum in the United States to become their best-selling album. It peaked at number 12 on the Billboard 200. The single "Down" reached number one on the Alternative Songs chart, and the single "All Mixed Up" reached number four. After that, 311 released the studio album Transistor in 1997. It peaked at number four on the Billboard 200 and went platinum.

Soundsystem was released in 1999, From Chaos was released in 2001, and Evolver was released in 2003; all three studio albums peaked in the top 10 of the Billboard 200. The band's 2004 compilation album Greatest Hits '93-'03 also peaked in the top 10. A single from Greatest Hits '93-'03, "Love Song", became 311's second single to top the Alternative Songs chart.

The band's next four studio albums, Don't Tread on Me (2005), Uplifter (2009), Universal Pulse (2011), and Stereolithic (2014), all peaked in the top 10 of the Billboard 200 as well. Uplifter went to number three, the highest chart position of any 311 album. The title track from Don't Tread on Me was released as a single and peaked at number two on the Alternative Songs chart.

Albums

Studio albums

Independent albums

Live albums

Compilation albums

Video albums

Extended plays

Singles

Music videos

Notes

References

External links

Discographies of American artists
Rock music group discographies
Discography